Zembla may refer to:

Zembla (comics), a French comics character created in 1963
Zembla (magazine), a British literary magazine published from 2003 to 2005
Zembla (TV series), a Dutch documentary television series
Novaya Zemlya, or Nova Zembla, an island in Russia
Zembla, a fictional kingdom appearing in Vladimir Nabokov's 1962 novel Pale Fire
ZEMBLA is one of five tracks written by Philippe Saisse for Japanese drummer Senri Kawaguchi's 2016 album Cider - Hard and Sweet.